Île d'Yeu or L'Île-d'Yeu, is an island and commune just off the Vendée coast of western France. The island's two harbors, Port-Joinville in the north and Port de la Meule to the south, in a rocky inlet of the southern granite coast, are famous for tuna and lobster fishing, respectively.

Administratively, the commune of L'Île-d'Yeu is part of the Vendée department and the Pays de la Loire region of France.

History

Neolithic markings in the native stone and an unusual concentration of megalithic dolmens and menhirs attest to the island's early sanctity. Irish monks from Bangor, County Down, dedicated their monastery on the Île d'Yeu to Hilaire; Saint Amand from Poitou received early training there, but it was destroyed by Viking raiders in the ninth century.

During the tenth century, monks from Marmoutier near Tours and monks of Saint-Cyprien at Poitiers built a new monastery and dedicated it to Saint Stephen. The castle built on an islet linked to the coast by a bridge is first mentioned in 1356.

Since the nineteenth century Île d'Yeu has attracted many artists. Jean Rigaud (1912–1999), official painter to the French Navy, had a house there, as did Maurice Boitel (1919–2007). Jean Dufy (1888-1964) made about twenty paintings of l'Ile d'Yeu during several summer stays between 1926 and 1930.

Philippe Pétain, the proclaimed hero of Verdun during World War I who later became the leader of France's wartime collaborationist Vichy régime, was sentenced to life imprisonment for treason on Île d'Yeu. He died in a private home in Port-Joinville in 1951, and is buried in the local cemetery (Cimetière communal de Port-Joinville).

The poet Marc-Adolphe Guégan, an early French exponent of haiku, lived on the island until his death in 1959.

The island's seaweeds have been the subject of studies by the French marine biologist Françoise Ardré.

The children's author Ludwig Bemelmans, who summered on the island, took inspiration from a hospital stay after a bicycle crash for his first Madeline book, published in 1939.

A two year pilot program, called Harmon’Yeu, was initiated in the Spring of 2020 to interconnect 23 houses in the Ker Pissot neighborhood and surrounding areas with a microgrid that was automated as a smart grid with software from Engie. Sixty-four solar panels with a peak capacity of 23.7 kW  were installed on five houses and a battery with a storage capacity of 15 kWh was installed on one house. Six houses store excess solar energy in their hot water heaters. A dynamic system apportions the energy provided by the solar panels and stored in the battery and hot water heaters to the system of 23 houses. The smart grid software dynamically updates energy supply and demand in 5 minute intervals, deciding whether to pull energy from the battery or from the panels and when to store it in the hot water heaters. This pilot program was the first such project in France.

Transport
The island is reached by ferry from Fromentine or Saint-Gilles-Croix-de-Vie. Air transportation is available at Île d'Yeu Aerodrome , with commercial service from Nantes Airport.

Climate
Île d'Yeu has an oceanic climate (Köppen: Cfb) with mild weather year-round and significantly more precipitation in winter than in summer.

Gallery

See also
 Vieux-château de l'Île d'Yeu
Communes of the Vendée department

References

External links

  Official site for the tourism office and commune of the Ile d'Yeu (in French)
 La Gazette de L'île d'Yeu

Communes of Vendée
Car-free zones in Europe
Yeu
Islands of the Bay of Biscay
Poitou